Abbotsbury Abbey, dedicated to Saint Peter, was a Benedictine monastery in the village of Abbotsbury in Dorset, England. The abbey was founded in the 11th century by King Cnut's thegn Orc and his wife Tola, who handsomely endowed the monastery with lands in the area. The abbey prospered and became a local centre of power, controlling eight manor houses and villages. During the later Middle Ages, the abbey suffered much misfortune. In the time of the dissolution of the monasteries, the last abbot surrendered the abbey and the site became the property of Sir Giles Strangways.

Today, a small part of the former Abbey estate, including the abbey's remains, and those of the nearby St Catherine's Chapel, are in the guardianship of English Heritage.

Foundation
The first reference to the site of Abbotsbury may be in a charter of King Edmund (r. 939–946) recording a grant of five hides of land at Abbedesburi to the thegn Sigewulf. The name (Abbedesburi) may suggest that the land had once belonged to an abbot. During the reign of King Cnut (r. 1016–1035), the Scandinavian thegn Orc (also Urki, Urk) and his wife Tola took up residence in the area, having been granted land at Portesham. Edward the Confessor (r. 1042–1066) also granted him Wootton and it was early in his reign that the couple founded a monastery at Abbotsbury, previously the site of a minor church. Orc and Tola, who had no children, enriched the monastery with a substantial amount of land, some of which was bequeathed after their deaths. By the time of the Domesday survey, Abbotsbury (itself worth 21 hides) was recorded to have held more than 65 hides of land TRE. Orc also established his own guild, which according to the extant statutes, had its hall at Abbotsbury and protected the minster's interests.

Last period and dissolution
During the 14th century the Black Death killed many villagers and also the abbot. Moreover, the village was repeatedly attacked from the sea, reducing the security  of the abbey and its status. In addition, the area suffered depredations from the forces sent to man the coastal defences. Later that century and in the century following the Abbey's situation had started to improve somewhat. In  1535 and  1539 Henry VIII undertook the forcible Dissolution of the Monasteries. Under the last Abbot of Abbotsbury, Roger Roddon, the Abbey was dissolved in 1539, following a visit from  Dr. Thomas Legh (Leigh, Lee). 

Upon the surrender of the abbey, on 12 March 1539, Abbot Roger Roddon, along with the prior and eight brethren received pensions: the abbot, £80; the prior, Thomas Bradford, £9; Thomas Tolpuddle, £7; six other brethren, including William Grey and John Vynsant, £6 to £5 each; Thomas Holnest, 40s.
Sir Giles Strangways (died 1546), the commissioner who had dissolved the monastery and who bought the abbey buildings, manor houses, water mills and Abbotsbury Swannery and much of the abbey's land for £1,906, 10s (equivalent to £ in ).  On the one hand  Strangways' own father had in fact been buried in the Abbey, and  when he himself died in 1546 his will  bequeathed £6 13s.4d. a year for two years for a priest to say Mass for the repose of his soul and the souls of his wife and son. 

Much of the land still belongs to Strangways' descendants, the Earls of Ilchester.

Remains

As was customary in such cases, Abbotsbury Abbey was largely demolished to maximize profit from the sale and to allow its stone to be reused. 

The  14th century  Great Barn, which at 272 ft by 31 ft is reputedly the largest thatched tithe barn in the world, was spared. Though now only half roofed, the still impressive structure has two porches, each surmounted by a watching chamber. Also spared from the general destruction was St Catherine's Chapel, used at one time as a lookout across the sea and conversely as a landmark for mariners. Both are currently Grade I listed buildings and scheduled monuments. In the churchyard to the south of the present parish church, traces of the old abbey church can be found. A further survivor is part of the end wall of what may possible have been part of the abbot's lodging, where two fireplaces can be seen. Other ruins visible on the site may have formed part of the guesthouse customary in monasteries. Often simple in style, these nevertheless offered much sought after safe shelter for travellers. Not far away, the Abbey's former swannery has become part of an internationally famous nature reserve.

Known Abbots of Abbotsbury

Henry VIII granted the abbey site to Sir Giles Strangways.

Burials
Humphrey Stafford (died 1413) and wife Elizabeth d'Aumale Mautravers Stafford
Sir John Mautravers
Humphrey Stafford (died 1442)

Notes

References

 Online: archive.org (PDF) and british-history.ac.uk (pp. 48–53)

External links

  Historical reconstruction of Abbotsbury Abbey from the air
 History of Abbotsbury
Abbotsbury Abbey at English Heritage
  St Catherine's Chapel: English Heritage

Monasteries in Dorset
Anglo-Saxon monastic houses
Benedictine monasteries in England
History of Dorset
Grade I listed buildings in Dorset
Grade I listed monasteries
Scheduled monuments in Dorset
English Heritage sites in Dorset
11th-century establishments in England
1538 disestablishments in England
Christian monasteries established in the 11th century
Lists of abbots
Monasteries dissolved under the English Reformation